CS St-Hubert is a Canadian semi-professional soccer club based in Saint-Hubert, Quebec that plays in the Première Ligue de soccer du Québec.

History

The club was originally formed in 1980. Prior to joining the PLSQ, the club played in the Ligue de Soccer Elite Quebec, which is the top amateur division in Quebec.

In 2017, the club joined the Première Ligue de soccer du Québec, a Division III league, fielding a team in the men's division. They played their first match on May 6 against CS Longueuil. They finished in sixth place out of seven teams in their inaugural season, but that did not dissuade coach François Bourgeais, who continued to play a young squad with an average age of under 21 the following season. In 2019, they had 14 different players score goals, which led the league in number of unique goalscorers.

In 2020, they had decided to add a team in the women's division of the Première Ligue de soccer du Québec. Cindy Walsh was announced as the team's head coach, making them the first club in the PLSQ with a female head coach. However, the 2020 season was postponed due to the COVID-19 pandemic. When the league restarted, the club decided to delay their female team's entry in the league and chose not to participate in the 2020 season, although their male team did enter.

Seasons 

Women

Notable former players
The following players have either played at the professional or international level, either before or after playing for the PLSQ team:

Men

Women

References

Soccer clubs in Quebec
St-Hubert